Connecticut's 100th House of Representatives district elects one member of the Connecticut House of Representatives. It encompasses parts of Middletown. The seat has been vacant since January 5, 2023, following the death of Quentin Williams, a Democrat.

Recent elections

2020

2018

2016

2014

2012

References

100